Bileh Savar (also Romanized as Bilesuvar) is a city in the Central District of Bileh Savar County, Ardabil province, Iran, serving as the capital of the county. At the 2006 census, its population was 14,027 in 3,251 households. The following census in 2011 counted 15,183 people in 4,033 households. The latest census in 2016 showed a population of 16,188 people in 4,837 households.

The city is the site of a border crossing with Republic of Azerbaijan. Pile-Savar was built by a dignitary of the Buyid dynasty who was called Pile-Savar (the Great Rider).

Road 33 connects it to Ardabil.

References 

Bileh Savar County

Cities in Ardabil Province

Populated places in Ardabil Province

Populated places in Bileh Savar County

Azerbaijan–Iran border crossings